Frederick "Fred" Harris (birth unknown – death unknown) was an English professional rugby league footballer who played in the 1930s and 1940s.

Playing career

International honours
Fred Harris won caps for England while at Leigh in 1934 against Australia, and while at Leeds in 1937 against France, was selected for Great Britain while at Leeds for the 1936 Great Britain Lions tour of Australia and New Zealand, and played for English League XIII while at Leigh against France.

County honours
Fred Harris played right-, i.e. number 3, in Lancashire's 7-5 victory over Australia in the 1937–38 Kangaroo tour of Great Britain and France match at Wilderspool Stadium, Warrington on Wednesday 29 September 1937, in front of a crowd of 16,250.

County Cup Final appearances
Fred Harris played right-, i.e. number 3, in Leeds' 14-8 victory over Huddersfield in the 1937–38 Yorkshire County Cup Final during the 1937–38 season at Belle Vue, Wakefield on Saturday 30 October 1937.

References

External links

England national rugby league team players
English rugby league players
Great Britain national rugby league team players
Lancashire rugby league team players
Leeds Rhinos players
Leigh Leopards players
Place of birth missing
Place of death missing
Rugby league centres
Rugby league wingers
Year of birth missing
Year of death missing